Kuwait Bangladesh Friendship Govt. Hospital or Kuwait Bangladesh Hospital is a government hospital situated in Dhaka, Bangladesh. The hospital was funded by Kuwaiti Joint Relief Committee. This is the first hospital to provide medical services to coronavirus infected patients as prescribed by the Government of Bangladesh.

Location 
Kuwait Bangladesh Friendship Hospital is located on Isha Khan Avenue, Sector 6, Uttara, Dhaka. The hospital is located behind RAJUK Uttara Model College.

History 
On 10 June 2001, Prime Minister Sheikh Hasina inaugurated Kuwait-Bangladesh Friendship Hospital. In 2002, the Kuwaiti Joint Relief Committee stopped funding the hospital, showing financial crisis reason.

A lease agreement was made between The Ministry of Health and  American Hospital Consortium on December 16, 2002. According to the agreement, The government transferred its responsibility to American Hospital Consortium. After the agreement name of the hospital was changed to "American Super Specialised Hospital". According to the agreement the responsible side had to upgrade the hospital to international standards by June 30, 2008. But the organisation failed to do so. Then in 2009 the government sued American Hospital Consortium for taking over rights of the government hospital illegally, leaving the matter of agreement cancellation pending. Six years later, the court ruled in favor of the government and the custody of the hospital was given to the health ministry.

The hospital was reopened later under the management of the Ministry of Health. Its responsibility was transferred to Kurmitola General Hospital in June, 2016. After two years ministry of health appointed new director. In December of the same year the indoor service with 100 beds was opened.

Staff and services 
As of May 2020, the hospital has 200 beds. There are 26 ICU beds. The hospital has 95 doctors for medical services. There are 113 nurses. There are three Ayurvedic doctors in charge of this hospital. Various services are provided here in about 22 departments including operation theater, ICU, examination department, cabin, ward, outpatient department and emergency department.

Infrastructure 
The Kuwait-Bangladesh Friendship Hospital is located in three acres land. The hospital has seven-storied building.

Role in pandemic 
This hospital was the first hospital in Bangladesh the government of Bangladesh designated for the medical care of corona patients. The hospital is made a major coronavirus treatment center.

See also
 List of hospitals in Bangladesh

References 

Uttara
Hospitals in Dhaka
Hospital buildings completed in 1996
Hospitals established in 2001
2001 establishments in Bangladesh
Bangladesh–Kuwait relations